Marc Muskatewitz (born 28 January 1996) is a German curler from Kempten.

He is a former German men's champion (2016).

He started playing curling in 2003.

Teams

References

External links

1996 births
Living people
German male curlers
German curling champions
People from Baden-Baden
Sportspeople from Karlsruhe (region)
21st-century German people